Operation Echo was the codename given by the Canadian Forces for its air activities during the Kosovo War in 1999. In support of the NATO Operation Allied Force Canadian aircraft based at Aviano Air Base in northeastern Italy flew bombing missions over the Balkans.

During the campaign the Canadian air contingent consisted of 18 CF-18 Hornet aircraft from 441 and 425 Tactical Fighter Squadrons, with 69 aircrew and 250 ground crew. Despite the fact that they comprised less than 2% of the nearly 1,000 Allied aircraft engaged in the conflict, they flew on 10% of all bombing missions.

See also
 Operation Kinetic (1999)
 List of Canadian military operations

References

Echo
Echo
Canada–Kosovo relations